The 2005 Hawaii Warriors football team represented the University of Hawaii at Manoa in the 2005 NCAA Division I-A football season. Hawaii finished the 2005 season with a 5–7 record, going 4–4 in WAC play. The losing record was the first for Hawaii since 2000 and the team did not play in a bowl game for the first time since 2002.

The 2005 season saw the addition of former Atlanta Falcons and Houston Oilers head coach Jerry Glanville as the team's defensive coordinator. The season began with a blowout road loss at Michigan State and a blowout home loss to Southern California.  The season also included heartbreaking defeats at home to Boise State, Fresno State and Wisconsin, but concluded with a win against San Diego State.

Schedule

Roster

Statistics
 QB Colt Brennan: 350/515 (68.0%) for 4,301 yards and 35 TD vs. 13 INT. 99 carries for 154 yards and 2 TD.
 RB Nate Ilaoa: 85 carries for 643 yards and 6 TD. 36 catches for 274 yards and 1 TD.
 WR Ryan Grice-Mullen: 85 catches for 1,228 yards and 12 TD.
 WR Davone Bess: 89 catches for 1,124 yards and 14 TD.
 WR Ross Dickerson: 51 catches for 725 yards and 4 TD.
 WR Chad Mock: 42 catches for 502 yards and 1 TD.
 WR Ian Sample: 12 catches for 172 yards and 1 TD.
 K Dan Kelly: 10/14 on field goals and 42/42 on extra points.

References

Hawaii
Hawaii Rainbow Warriors football seasons
Hawaii Warriors football